Heinz Engelmann (1911–1996) was a German film actor. He was married to the actress Gertrud Meyen.

Selected filmography
 D III 88 (1939)
 Drei Unteroffiziere (1939)
 Congo Express (1939)
 The Girl at the Reception (1940)
 U-Boote westwärts (1941)
 The Big Game (1942)
 Blocked Signals (1948)
 Derby (1949)
 Harbour Melody (1950)
 Border Post 58 (1951)
 The Cloister of Martins (1951)
 All Clues Lead to Berlin (1952)
 Three from Variety (1954)
The Blacksmith of St. Bartholomae (1955)
 Melody of the Heath (1956)
 The Hunter from Roteck (1956)
 Stahlnetz (TV series, 7 episodes, 1959–1968)
 (1959)
 (1960)
 (1961)
 (1962)
 (1962)
 (1964)
 (1968)
 Herr Puntila and His Servant Matti (1955/1960)
 When the Heath Is in Bloom (1960)
 The Inn on the River (1962)
 The Seventh Victim (1964)
 4 Schlüssel (1966)
 Förster Horn (TV series, 13 episodes, 1966)
 More (1969)
 Junger Herr auf altem Hof (TV series, 13 episodes, 1969–1970)

Further reading
 Robert Dassanowsky. Austrian Cinema: A History. McFarland, 2005.

References

External links

1911 births
1996 deaths
German male film actors
German male television actors
20th-century German male actors
Male actors from Berlin